Mansehra (Rural) Takiya Shungli is in Union Council Bandi Shungli (Tanawal) Tehsil Oghi, almost 19 KM away from Oghi, people speak Hindko, Gugri, Pashto and Tanooli languages. Mankiyal, Gujjars, Pathan and few Swati live in the area.

Union Council (an administrative subdivision) of Mansehra District in Khyber-Pakhtunkhwa province of Pakistan. It is located in the south of the district and to the southeast of the district capital, Mansehra.

References

Union councils of Mansehra District